The Cabinet Schröder I was the state government of the German state of Lower Saxony from 21 June 1990 until 20 June 1994. The Cabinet was headed by Minister President Gerhard Schröder and was formed by the Social Democratic Party and the Alliance '90/The Greens, after Schröder's winning of the 1990 Lower Saxony state election. On 21 June 1990 Schröder was elected and sworn in as Minister President by the Landtag of Lower Saxony. It was succeeded by Schröder's second and third cabinets.

Schröder left the position in 1998 upon being elected Chancellor. Two members of this cabinet - Funke and Trittin - were also part of Schröder's first cabinet as Chancellor.

Composition 

|}

Notes

Schröder I
1990 establishments in Germany
1994 disestablishments in Germany
Gerhard Schröder